Acushnet Cedar Swamp is a  swamp located in Bristol County, Massachusetts. It is managed by the Massachusetts Department of Environmental Protection. In 1972, Acushnet Cedar Swamp was designated as a National Natural Landmark by the National Park Service. The New Bedford Regional Airport borders the swamp to the south.

One of the State's largest, wildest and most impenetrable swamps, and an outstanding example of the diversity of conditions and species in the glaciated section of the oak-chestnut forest.

See also
List of National Natural Landmarks in Massachusetts
List of Massachusetts State Parks
List of old growth forests in Massachusetts

References

Landforms of Bristol County, Massachusetts
National Natural Landmarks in Massachusetts
New Bedford, Massachusetts
Protected areas of Bristol County, Massachusetts
Tourist attractions in New Bedford, Massachusetts